ROH 16th Anniversary was a two-night professional wrestling event produced by American promotion Ring of Honor (ROH), which took place Friday, March 9 and Saturday March 10, 2018, at the Sam's Town Hotel and Gambling Hall in the Las Vegas suburb of Sunrise Manor, Nevada.  Friday's show was a pay-per-view broadcast, while Saturday's was a set of tapings for ROH's flagship program Ring of Honor Wrestling.

Storylines
This professional wrestling event featured professional wrestling matches, which involve different wrestlers from pre-existing scripted feuds, plots, and storylines. Wrestlers portray villains or heroes as they follow a series of events that build tension and culminate in a wrestling match or series of matches.

Results

Night 1 (PPV)

Night 2 (TV Tapings)

See also
2018 in professional wrestling
List of Ring of Honor pay-per-view events

References

Professional wrestling in the Las Vegas Valley
2018 in Nevada
16
March 2018 events in the United States
2018 Ring of Honor pay-per-view events
Events in Sunrise Manor, Nevada